Fighting Clowns is a 1980 album by the Firesign Theatre. It is unique among Firesign Theatre albums because it is primarily made up of songs rather than the group's usual audio theater or sketch comedy pieces. Many of the songs on this album were recorded live in front of an audience while some of the songs and much of the linking material was recorded in the studio. Cover artwork was done by Phil Hartman.

Track listing

Side one

 "The Bozos Song"
 "The Four Gobs"
 "The 8 Shoes"
 "In The Hot Tub"
 "Hey, Reagan"

Side two

 "In The War Zone"
 "Oh, Afghanistan"
 "In The Alley"
 "Violent Juvenile Freaks"
 "In The Hot Tub Again"
 "This Bus Won't Go To War"

Bonus tracks

 "Jimmy Carter"

Performers

Phil Austin — Vocals and Rhythm Guitar
Peter Bergman — Vocals
David Ossman — Vocals
Philip Proctor — Vocals
Richard Parker — Keyboards
Jeff Baxter — Lead Guitar
Tim Emmons — Bass
Ed Roscetti — Drums
John Mitchell — Tenor & Baritone Sax
Dick Spencer — Alto Sax & Clarinet
Richard Cooper — Trumpet 
Phil Hartman    Album Cover Illustration

Release history

There have been numerous issues and re-issues of this album (and excerpts from this album) in a variety of formats including a one-sided picture disc.

LP - Rhino RNLP-018 - 1980
Cassette — Rhino RNC-018 - 1980
Picture Disc — Rhino RNPD-904 - 1980
CD Mobile Fidelity MFCD-748 - 1993
CD Firesign Theatre Records (distributed through Whirlwind Media) - 2001
CD Firesign Theatre Records / Lodestone Catalog 2006

Citations

  Smith, Ronald L.  The Goldmine Comedy Record Price Guide. Iola: Krause, 1996.
  Carruthers, Sean. "Fighting Clowns > Overview." Allmusic. March 4, 2006  – 10:3hq7g4gttvoz.
    Firesign Theatre.  Fighting Clowns.  Mobile Fidelity, 1993.

External links
The Firesign Theatre's Official Website
FIREZINE: Linques! (A Firesign Theatre FAQ)

1980 albums
The Firesign Theatre albums
Rhino Records albums
1980s comedy albums